The International Congress of Zookeepers (ICZ) promotes the goals and objectives of American Association of Zoo Keepers (AAZK), Inc. on an international level, increases awareness of AAZK, and enhances communication among the world’s zoo professionals. The ICZ evolved from AAZK’s now-extinct International Outreach Committee (IOC). A major accomplishment of the IOC was procuring a travel grant which afforded the opportunity for representatives from seven of the world’s professional zookeeper associations to meet at the AAZK conference in Columbus, Ohio, in 2000. These seven representatives met to discuss the need for better communication among zookeepers worldwide. The idea to create the International Congress of Zookeepers (ICZ) was formulated.

Representatives at the 2000 meeting of the World’s Professional Zookeeper Associations were:
 American Association of Zoo Keepers (AAZK)
 Association of British Wild Animal Keepers (ABWAK)
 Australasian Society of Zoo Keeping (ASZK)
 Asociación Ibérica de Cuidadores de Animales Salvajes (AICAS)
 Association Francophone des Soigneurs Animaliers (ASFA)
 Berufsverband der Zootierpfleger (BdZ)
 Stichting De Harpij (De Harpij)

A steering committee (SC) was formed to direct the progress of the ICZ and create a vision for the budding association. The SC consists of two volunteer members from each of the professional keeper associations. As of 2014, the SC of the ICZ consists of 18 members representing the world's nine professional keeper associations. They have met once a year since 2000 to coordinate the development of an international association that will promote professional animal care throughout the world. Currently, the ICZ is operated completely by volunteer committee members. The ICZ has five priorities; keeper development (workshops and aiding keepers in developing countries receive access to resources and information), the hosting of international conferences or congress every three years, assisting with the development of new national keeper associations, development of the global network of zookeepers, and conservation. 

2015 world’s professional keeper associations that make up the ICZ:
 American Association of Zoo Keepers (AAZK)
 Association of British & Irish Wild Animal Keepers (ABWAK)
 Australasian Society of Zoo Keeping (ASZK)
 Asociación Ibérica de Cuidadores de Animales Salvajes (AICAS) (Spain & Portugal)
 Association Francophone des Soigneurs Animaliers (AFSA) (France)
 Berufsverband der Zootierpfleger (BdZ) (Germany)
 Stichting De Harpij (Netherlands and Belgium)
 Zookeepers’ Association of the Philippines (ZAP) (Established 2006)

Strategic directions of the ICZ
 Achieve the highest standards of zoo keeping globally.
 To assist zoos in need of improvement.
 Securing the financial growth and stability needed to implement the ICZ’s strategy.
 Increasing ICZ's visibility and impact.
 Improving and developing the ICZ, reflecting the needs of zookeepers, zookeeper associations and zoos needing improvement.
 Developing and delivering ICZ’s core conservation activities.
 Developing and strengthening ICZ’s external partnerships.
 Procure and develop a professional administrative management.

International Congress on Zoo Keeping (conference)

The first major goal for the ICZ was to organize an international keeper conference or congress. In 2003, the first congress of the ICZ was held at Avifauna in the Netherlands. In 2006, the Congress was held at the Gold Coast, Australia. In 2009, the Congress was held in conjunction with the 36th AAZK National Conference at Woodland Park Zoo, Seattle, Washington, United States. In 2012, the Congress was held at the Wildlife Reserves Singapore. A total of over 1,100 zookeepers from all over the world have attended the four previous ICZ conferences. The upcoming 5th International Congress on Zoo Keeping will be held at Leipzig, Germany, September 9-13th, 2015. We are anticipating at least 300 zookeepers and other delegates from all around the world attending this Congress. Associations interested in hosting a Congress after 2015 should contact the ICZ SC.
The ICZ does have scholarship available to aid keepers in developing countries to attend the Congress. Just an example; for the 2012 Congress in Singapore, the ICZ gave five full scholarships and three partial scholarships, which allowed participants from the Philippines, India, Uganda, France, Mexico, Taiwan, and Singapore to attend the 4th ICZ Congress. Since the ICZ’s first Congress is 2003, approximately 15 scholarships have been awarded to delegates from all over the world. It was with heavy heart in September 2012, when the ICZ lost one of its own SC members, Mr. Paul Howse.  Paul had worked tirelessly for the ICZ since its inception and to honor his life, love, and enthusiasm, the ICZ SC created the Paul Howse Scholarship, which will be awarded to a commendable delegate for the first time at the 2015 ICZ Congress at Leipzig. In 2018 the ICZ Congress will be in Argentina.

Current members

American Association of Zookeepers (AAZK)

The American Association of Zoo Keepers, Inc. began in 1967 in San Diego, CA with the purpose of promoting professionalism in zoo keeping through education of zoological staff members in the most modern and current techniques of captive exotic animal care. AAZK's mission is to provide a resource and a forum of continuing education for the animal care professional and to support zoo and aquarium personnel in their roles as animal care givers, scientific researchers, public educators and conservationists; to promote zoos and aquariums as cultural establishments dedicated to the enrichment of human and natural resources; to foster the exchange of research materials, enrichment options and husbandry information through publications and conferences which will lead to a greater understanding of the needs and requirements of all animals.

Asociación Ibérica de Cuidadores de Animales Salvajes (AICAS)

Founded in 2000, the Iberian Association of Zookeepers (AICAS) is constituted by Spanish and Portuguese Associates with the main goals of promoting the education, the professionalization and the exchange and dissemination of information in relation to the care and management of wild animals in captivity.
It is also meant to encourage the preservation of biodiversity through the involvement of the workforce of zoos, aquariums, centers for rehabilitation and reintroduction of wildlife, nature reserves, parks and every other person working in the care and management of exotic wildlife or with a direct or indirect link with wildlife.

Association Francophone de Soigneurs Animaliers (AFSA)

The Francophone Association of Zoo Keepers was created in order to develop methods of care and handling of wild animals in captivity. This association is a link between professionals working in the fields of training, public presentations, research, care, conservation and education.
In 1999, three keepers from Doué-la-Fontaine Zoo, Pont-Scorff Zoo, and Branfere's Park begin to talk about the possibility of creating a Professional Association of keepers like in other countries. The need to create AFSA was due to the fact that in France there is no exchange between keepers regarding zoo keeping and the occupation of zookeeper wasn't professionally recognized. AFSA is an association of keepers only directed by keepers; it is addressed to all French keepers as well as staffs of zoos, aquariums, aviaries, etc.
The first meeting took place in November 1999 with the assistance of representatives from other Professional Associations.

Association of British Wild Animal Keepers (ABWAK)

The Association of British Wild Animal Keepers is a non-profit organization which has set its following goals and objectives: To improve cooperation among animal keepers, both nationally and internationally. To provide, encourage and organize facilities for the meeting of keepers of wild animals. To improve, through education, the professional competence of all involved with wild animal husbandry and to support the conservation of wildlife throughout the world.

Australasian Society of Zookeeping (ASZK)

Formed in 1976, the Australasian Society of Zookeeping is primarily a professional organization in the Australasian region, which seeks to promote the exchange of information on all aspects of wild animal husbandry, and in so doing add to the conservation of rare and endangered species. The Society achieves these objectives through the production its journal, "Thylacinus", e-newsletters, workshops, and annual conferences which are held throughout the Australasian region. ASZK currently has over 400 members covering Australia, New Zealand, and overseas members from Japan and the United States.

Berufsverband der Zootierpfleger (BdZ)

The Berufsverband der Zootierpfleger was founded in 1993 at the Zoo Frankfurt. Our Association now has more than 1,000 members mainly in Germany, but also in Switzerland, Austria, and Denmark. We want to promote nature conservation and species protection, but most importantly we care about the education and training of zookeepers. BdZ has a journal three times a year and several special editions with different topics. BdZ has annual meeting and several workshops through the year, sometimes in other countries. We are associated member of the EAZA and working closely together with the other German zoo organizations.

Stichting De Harpij

The Harpy Foundation is an organization for Dutch and Belgian zoo employees. It does not have a membership, but does publish a quarterly journal, “The Harpy”, that is available by subscription. The foundation’s chief goal is “the improvement of care and well-being of non-domestic animals in the broadest sense of the word”. 
The Harpy’s began in 1980 when a group of zookeepers from the former Wassenaar Zoo took the initiative to distribute a newsletter written by zookeepers for zookeepers. They hoped via this publication to broaden their knowledge by exchanging experiences with keepers in other zoos. The first years were quite difficult, and it was sometimes questionable whether there was a reason to continue. But by 1985 the interest in the publication had grown, eventually resulting in the official establishment of the Harpy Foundation on May 18, 1988. 
Much has changed in the years since then. Thanks to the support from the directorship of the participating zoos, and the efforts of approximately 30 zoo personnel, the Harpy Foundation has grown into an organization that is here to stay in the zoo world. The primary target group is the personnel of zoos in the Netherlands and Belgium that are members of EAZA.

Zookeepers Association of the Philippines (ZAP)

ZAP is the first professional association of zookeepers in the Philippines. ZAP's aims and objectives are to professionalize and promote brotherhood among zookeepers, to serve as a venue for networking and exchange of ideas and information, to promote concerted effort of zookeepers for education and conservation of wildlife, and to uphold standards on rescue, display and captive breeding of wild animals. ZAP has more than 90 members nationwide. ZAP is one of two Professional Associations the ICZ helped to organize.

Partners and supporting members

The Partners for the ICZ are; the International Rhino Keeper Association, the International Association of Avian Trainers and Educators (IATTE), and the Shape of Enrichment.
The Supporting Members for the ICZ are; Zoo Frankfurt, Wildlife Reserves Singapore, Travel Traffic Web Design, Woodland Park Zoo, Chester Zoo, Barcelona Zoo, Zoo Leipzig, Busch Gardens Tampa, Florida, and Zoo de Lagos.

References

http://zoonation.org/tag/international-congress-of-zoo-keepers/

Zookeepers